The Ballpark is a ballpark in Old Orchard Beach, Maine, United States.

Other venues known as The Ballpark include:
The Ballpark at Hallsville, Hallsville, Texas
The Ballpark at Harbor Yard, Bridgeport, Connecticut
The Ballpark at Jackson, Jackson, Tennessee
The Ballpark of the Palm Beaches, West Palm Beach, Florida
The Ballpark (Gainesville), Gainesville, Florida
The Ballpark at Arlington, now Choctaw Stadium, Arlington, Texas
The Ballpark at Disney's Wide World of Sports, now The Stadium at the ESPN Wide World of Sports, Kissimmee, Florida
The Ballpark in Grand Prairie, now AirHogs Stadium, Grand Prairie, Texas
The Ballpark at St. Johns, now Jack Kaiser Stadium, New York City
The Ballpark at Venetian Gardens, now Pat Thomas Stadium, Leesburg, Florida